Steve Rohlik is an American ice hockey head coach and former player. In April 2013 he became head coach in charge of the men's program at Ohio State.

Career
Rohlik got his start at the college level as a player for Wisconsin in the late '80's. He spent four years playing for the Badgers, spending two campaigns as team captain and winning a national title in his senior season. After graduating with a degree in Communications/Journalism Rohlik became an assistant for his alma mater for a year before pursuing an abbreviated professional career with the Knoxville Cherokees. During that year he also served as an assistant with Stillwater Area High School but left to become the head coach for the Hill-Murray School, a secondary school near his home town.

In 1997 Rohlik left Minnesota and returned to the college ranks as an assistant for the new program at Nebraska–Omaha under Mike Kemp. Rohlik remained with the Mavericks for three seasons before he accepted a similar position with Minnesota–Duluth with their new bench boss, Scott Sandelin. Rohlik worked for the Bulldogs for a decade, leaving the year before the program won its first national title, to become an associate coach with Ohio State beneath his former college teammate Mark Osiecki. For three years the Buckeyes struggled to achieve the .500 mark and in 2013 Osiecki was let go. Nine days after his future with the program became uncertain Rohlik was hired as the head coach.

When Rohlik took over he did so just in time for the Buckeyes to start competing in the Big Ten. In his first year Rohlik got the Buckeyes to record their first winning season in five years and finished as the runner-up in the inaugural conference tournament. Over the next two years the Buckeyes had losing records but Rohlik managed to get his team to win a conference tournament game in each year. In his fourth season the Buckeyes finally got back into the NCAA tournament, posting a 21-win season in the process. He is signed to be the head coach at Ohio State through 2021.

Career statistics

Head coaching record

College

}}

|confrecord   = 
}}

References

1968 births
Living people
American men's ice hockey left wingers
High school ice hockey coaches in the United States
Knoxville Cherokees players
Minnesota Duluth Bulldogs men's ice hockey coaches
Ohio State Buckeyes men's ice hockey coaches
Omaha Mavericks men's ice hockey coaches
Pittsburgh Penguins draft picks
Wisconsin Badgers men's ice hockey coaches
Wisconsin Badgers men's ice hockey players
People from Saint Paul, Minnesota
Ice hockey coaches from Minnesota
NCAA men's ice hockey national champions
Ice hockey players from Minnesota